The following is a timeline of the history of the city of Bamako, Mali.

Prior to 20th century

 16th century - Bambara in power.
 1880 - Mandinka Samory Touré in power (approximate date).
 1883
 1 February: Town occupied by French forces under command of Gustave Borgnis-Desbordes.
 Fort built by French.

20th century

 1903 - Fort demolished.
 1904 - Koulikoro-Bamako railway built.
 1906 - Chamber of commerce established.
 1907 -  (presidential residence) built.
 1908 - 23 May: Capital of French colonial Upper Senegal and Niger relocated to Bamako from Kayes.
 1919 - Bamako becomes a "commune-mixte" (form of administration).(fr)
 1920
 Bamako becomes capital of colonial French Sudan.
 Population: 16,000 (estimate).
 1921 - Catholic Apostolic Vicariate of Bamako active.
 1923 - Dakar-Bamako railroad begins operating.
 1924 -  dedicated.
 1927 - Sacred Heart Cathedral built.
 1929 - "Submersible causeway to Sotuba" built across the Niger River.
 1933 - Ecole Artisanale du Soudan (art school)  established (later Institut National des Arts de Bamako).
 1934 - Institut de la Lèpre (medical entity) begins operating.
 1936 - Population: 21,000 (estimate).
 1945 - Population: 36,000 (estimate).
 1946 - Rassemblement Démocratique Africain political party headquartered in city.
 1947 - Dakar–Niger Railway labor strike.
 1948 - Photographer Seydou Keïta in business.
 1949 - L'Essor newspaper begins publication.
 1953 - Sudanese Museum opens.
 1956 - Modibo Keïta elected mayor.
 1958
 Vincent Auriol Bridge built.
 Photographer Malick Sidibé in business.
 Population: 76,000.
 1960
 City becomes capital of the Republic of Mali.
 Djoliba AC (football club) formed.
 Stade Modibo Kéïta (stadium) opens.
 Population: 130,00 urban agglomeration.
 1963 - École Normale Supérieure of Bamako opens.
 1965
  founded.
 Population: 168,000.
 1970s - Grand Mosque of Bamako built.
 1972 - Population: 225,000 (estimate).
 1974 - Twin city relationship established with Angers, France.
 1975 - Sister city relationship established with Rochester, New York, United States.
 1976 - 
 Population 419,239
 1977 - 18 May: Funeral of Modibo Keita.
 1978
 Groupe Bogolan Kasobané (artisan group) formed.
 1980 - March: Saharan states summit held in city.
 1982 - National Museum of Mali active.
 1983 - Office de Radiodiffusion-Télévision du Mali headquartered in city.
 1984 - October: Meeting of Economic Community of West African States held in city.
 1987
 "Islamic centre" built.
 African health ministers meet in city, adopt "Bamako Initiative" for healthcare.
 Population: 658,275 in city.
 1989 - Les Échos newspaper begins publication.
 1990s - Hippopotamus  erected.
 1991
 22 March: Anti-government protest; crackdown.
 26 March: 1991 Malian coup d'état occurs.
 1992
 19 January:  held.
 King Fahd Bridge opens.
 1994
 Rencontres africaines de la photographie biennial exhibit begins.
 BCEAO Tower built.
 1995 - Monument de l'Indépendance and Monument to the Martyrs dedicated.(fr)
 1996
 University of Bamako opens.
 Monument to Daniel Ouezzin Coulibaly dedicated.(fr)
 1998
  established.
 Ibrahima N'Diaye becomes district mayor.
 Population: 1,016,167 in city.
 2000
 Fresques murales de Koulouba (monument) built.(fr)
 Monument to Kwame Nkrumah  dedicated.(fr)
 Sister city relationship established with São Paulo, Brazil.

21st century

 2001
 Kita-Bamako road constructed.
 Stade du 26 Mars (stadium) opens.
 2002
 2002 African Cup of Nations football contest held in Bamako.
 Monument to Patrice Lumumba dedicated.(fr)
 2003 -  becomes district mayor.
 2005
 Budapest-Bamako car race begins.
 Geekcorps office established.
 2007 -  becomes district mayor.
 2009
  headquartered in city.
 Population: 1,810,366 urban agglomeration.
 2011
  active.
 2015 - 20 November: 2015 Bamako hotel attack occurs in Hippodrome.
 2016 - 21 March: Attack on headquarters of the European Union military training mission in Bamako.

See also
 Bamako history

References

This article incorporates information from the French Wikipedia.

Bibliography

in English
 
 
 
 “Bamako,” New Encyclopedia of Africa 2nd Edition, editors John Middleton and Joseph Miller (Detroit: Charles Scribner's Sons, 2008)

in French

External links

   (Bibliography of open access  articles)
  (Images, etc.)
  (Images, etc.)
  (Bibliography)
  (Bibliography)
  (Bibliography)
 
 

History of Bamako
Bamako
Years in Mali
bamako
Bamako